Jochen Graf (born November 15, 1989) is a former professional footballer turned Sports Agent at Sports Entertainment Group, a football agency  based in The Netherlands.

Early life
Graf was born in College Station but raised in Dallas, Texas, and played for the Dallas Texans and Andromeda 90. Graf won back-to-back USYS national championships in 2017 and 2018 where he won the golden boot both years and scored the opening goal of the final in 2017.

Career
After redshirting his freshman season at Southern Methodist University in 2008, Graf played fours years of college soccer at Bradley University between 2009 and 2012, where he made a total of 77 appearances and scored 15 goals.

After spells in Germany and Sweden, Graf returned to the United States in 2017, when he signed for United Soccer League club Rochester Rhinos. On April 1, 2017, Graf scored the winning goal on his debut, giving Rochester a 3-2 victory over Bethlehem Steel FC.

Graf signed with USL side Tampa Bay Rowdies on January 4, 2018.

On 3 January 31, 2019, Graf joined the New York Cosmos.

On April 25, 2019, Graf signed for USL Championship side Memphis 901 ahead of their inaugural season. After playing professional soccer for 9 seasons, Graf announced his retirement and settled in to St. Petersburg with his wife, Kelli Haemmelmann.

Retirement
On October 18, 2019, Graf announced his retirement from professional soccer.

Personal life
On December 5, 2020, Graf married former DI college player at FGCU and marketing executive, Kelli Haemmelmann. They are welcomed their first child, a boy, in December of 2021.

References

1989 births
Living people
American soccer players
Association football forwards
Bradley Braves men's soccer players
People from Denton County, Texas
Memphis 901 FC players
Reno 1868 FC players
Rochester New York FC players
SMU Mustangs men's soccer players
Soccer players from Texas
Sportspeople from the Dallas–Fort Worth metroplex
Tampa Bay Rowdies players
USL Championship players
United Premier Soccer League players